Technoflash was a Canadian documentary television series which aired on CBC Television from 1972 to 1973.

This series featured the role of technology in Canadian industry.

Scheduling
The half-hour episodes were broadcast Sundays at 2:30 p.m. (Eastern) on 9, 23 and 30 January 1972, 27 February 1972, 5 and 19 March 1972 and 7 January 1973.

References

External links
 

CBC Television original programming
1972 Canadian television series debuts
1973 Canadian television series endings
1970s Canadian documentary television series